The Giant Jam Sandwich is a children's picture book, with story and pictures by John Vernon Lord and verses by Janet Burroway. The rhyming story tells how the fictional town of Itching Down was invaded by four million wasps. The villagers decide to build a gigantic jam sandwich to trap the pesky insects.

A narrated orchestral work on the book was written in 2008 by composer Philip Wharton. Janet Burroway was at its premier and has since been the narrator at other performances. An adaptation by New Perspectives Theatre premiered in 2017.

References

Giant Jam Sandwich, The
Houghton Mifflin books
British children's books
American picture books